Lestes vigilax, the swamp spreadwing, is a damselfly of the genus Lestes. It grows between 42 and 55 mm long. It ranges from eastern North America west to Minnesota, Oklahoma, and Texas, and to Georgia and South Carolina. It is most commonly seen between May and October.

References
 

V
Odonata of North America
Insects of the United States
Fauna of the Eastern United States
Insects described in 1862